Laski or Łaski (Polish feminine: Łaska, plural: Łascy) is a surname. Notable people with the surname include:

 Albert Łaski (died 1604), Polish alchemist
 Jan Łaski (1456–1531), Polish chancellor and archbishop
 Harold Laski (1893–1950), English political theorist, economist, author, and lecturer
 Hieronymus Jaroslaw Łaski (1496–1542), Polish palatine and diplomat, a nephew of Archbishop Łaski
 Jan Łaski (1499–1560), Polish Protestant evangelical reformer, a nephew of Archbishop Łaski
 Kazimierz Laski (born 1921), Polish-Austrian economist
 Neville Laski (1890–1969), English judge and leader of Anglo-Jewry.
 Marghanita Laski (1915–1988), English journalist, radio panellist and novelist
 Michael Laski (born c. 1942), founder of the Communist Party USA (Marxist-Leninist)

Polish-language surnames